This is a list of Slovenian literary historians and critics.

Matija Čop (1797–1835)
Anton Janežič (1828–1869)
Fran Levstik (1831–1887)
Matija Murko (1861–1952)
Ivan Grafenauer (1880–1964)
Izidor Cankar (1886–1958)
Avgust Pirjevec (1887–1944)
Josip Vidmar (1895–1992)
Anton Vodnik (1901–1965)
Ivo Brnčič (1912–1943)
Dušan Pirjevec Ahac (1921–1977)
Bojan Štih (1923–1982)
Taras Kermauner (1930–2008)
Janko Kos (b. 1931)
Jože Pogačnik (1933–2002)
Rastko Močnik (b. 1944)
Miran Hladnik (b. 1954)
Aleš Debeljak (1961–2016)
Simona Škrabec (b. 1968)

 
 
Literary historians and critics